Ojos azules, is a "taquirari" (traditional bolivian folklore) registered in 1947 by the Bolivian composer Gilberto Rojas Enriquez. The Peruvian composer Manuel Casazola Huancco was also erroneously attributed as the author of the song. According to investigations about the origin of the song, it was originally known as "Ojos bonitos" (Pretty Eyes), a traditional Peruvian huayno from Cuzco. The song remains popular in the repertoire of Andean music groups from Bolivia, Peru, Chile, and Argentina.

Lyrics 
Ojos azules no llores,

no llores ni te enamores.

Llorarás cuando me vaya,

cuando remedio ya no haya.

Tú me juraste quererme,

quererme toda la vida.

No pasaron dos, tres días,

tú te alejas y me dejas.

En una copa de vino

quisiera tomar veneno

veneno para matarme,

veneno para olvidarte.

English translation 
Blue eyes don't cry

Don't cry or fall in love

You will cry after I leave

When there is no more remedy

You swore to love me

Love me your entire life

Two, three days went by

You went away and left me

In a wine glass

I wish I could drink venom

Venom to kill myself

Venom to forget you

You'll cry when I go away.

External links
 https://www.sadaic.org.ar/obras.autor.php?paginate=5&ir=ir&codigo=69003
 https://cedib.org/post_type_titulares/mercedes-sosa-y-la-ojos-azules-cambio-fecha-2009-10-06/
 http://sadaic.org.ar/obras.repartos.php?nro_obra=601704
 https://elfulgor.com/noticia/228/gilberto-rojas-el-orureno
 https://c7LqJCTUtz1w

References

Andean music
Bolivian songs